Epidendrum dipus is a species of orchid in the genus Epidendrum.

dipus